Adele Parks  is an English women's fiction author. She has written 21 novels in her 21-year career as an author and is one of the bestselling authors of women's fiction in the United Kingdom.

Biography
Parks was born in Teesside. She decided she wanted to be a writer at the age of 7 and studied English at the University of Leicester. Before becoming a novelist, Parks worked in advertising and management consultancy. Her debut novel, Playing Away, was released in 2000.

As of January 2022, she has sold over 4 million UK edition copies of her novels and her books have been translated into 30 languages. Every one of her 21 novels are bestsellers in the UK.

Her Majesty the Queen gave her the honour of M.B.E in the New Year Honours List 2022.
She was a judge of the Costa Book Awards in 2010 and has regularly been the judge of the Costa Short Story Awards.
In 2009 she was awarded an honorary doctorate, a Doctor of Letters, by Teesside University.
Her Quick Read book, Happy Families, won the Learners' Favourite Award.
She is an ambassador for literacy charity The Reading Agency and a Patron of the National Literacy Trust.
She is also a Patron of The Guildford Book Festival.

Lies, Lies, Lies was shortlisted for the 2020 Fiction Book of the Year in the British Book Awards.

In 2020, Parks entered a deal with MPCA and Engage Productions for cinematic adaptations of her books.

Parks was appointed Member of the Order of the British Empire (MBE) in the 2022 New Year Honours for services to literature.

Personal life
Parks has been married twice, divorcing her first husband aged 32. She has an adult son, Conrad.

Works
Playing Away (2000)
Game Over (2001)
Larger Than Life (2002)
The Other Woman's Shoes (2003)
Still Thinking of You (2004)
Husbands (2005)
Young Wives' Tales (2007)
Happy Families (2008)
Tell Me Something (2008)
Love Lies (2009)
Men I've Loved Before (2010)
About Last Night (2011)
Whatever It Takes (2012)
The State We're In (2013)
Spare Brides (2014)
If You Go Away (2015)
Love Is a Journey (2016)
The Stranger in My Home (2016)
The Image of You (2017)
I Invited Her In (2018)
Lies Lies Lies (2019)
Just My Luck (2020)
Both of You (2021)
One Last Secret (2022)

References

External links

21st-century English novelists
Alumni of the University of Leicester
Living people
1969 births
Members of the Order of the British Empire